Bruntingthorpe is a village and civil parish in the Harborough district of Leicestershire, England. According to the census in 2001 the parish had a population of 398. The parish also includes the hamlet of Upper Bruntingthorpe. The population at the 2011 census had increased to 425. the village contains a pub called the plough, a restaurant called the joiners and a garage called bruntingthorpe motor engineers.

The former RAF Bruntingthorpe is now Bruntingthorpe Aerodrome.

History
The village's name means 'outlying farm/settlement of Brenting/Branting'.

Bruntingthorpe is in the Domesday book where it is listed amongst the lands held by Hugh de Grandmesnil for the King.

References

Villages in Leicestershire
Civil parishes in Harborough District